Snailham Halt railway station was on the South Eastern Railway's route between Ashford and , nowadays known as the Marshlink Line. It opened in 1907 and closed in 1959.

History
The 1851 Census shows no activity, but the 1851 Census shows a "Railway Crossing" with the associated cottage shown occupied by a Platelayer in each subsequent Census. The 1911 Census shows that the crossing cottage was occupied by James Sargent and that his wife Charlotte is the Crossing Keeper.

However, at the turn of the 19th century, the South Eastern and Chatham Railway (SECR) introduced a scheme to develop traffic on lightly used branch lines by providing basic halts served by railmotor services.

Snailham Crossing Halt had two platforms; its name was shortened to Snailham Halt in 1909. It was situated in a remote location nearly -mile from the nearest dwelling and accessed via an unsurfaced country lane. The railmotor services were not a great success as passengers disliked the units which also lacked operational flexibility.

Snailham Halt was closed on 2 February 1959, and is the only station between Ashford and Hastings to have been closed.

References

External links
Snailham Halt on navigable 1940 O.S. map

Disused railway stations in East Sussex
Former South Eastern Railway (UK) stations
Railway stations in Great Britain opened in 1907
Railway stations in Great Britain closed in 1959
Icklesham